The Owlshead Mountains are located at the southern end of Death Valley National Park near the border of the Fort Irwin Military Reservation in San Bernardino County, California, US.

Geography

The range lies in the Mojave Desert, north of the Granite Mountains and the Avawatz Mountains, south of the Black Mountains forming the bottom of Death Valley. The Greenwater Range is to the northeast, the Slate Range is west, and the Kingston Range east.

The mean annual precipitation in the range is five inches or less. The Owlshead Mountains are arranged in a semi-circular pattern,
with the Amargosa River lying to the north.

The Owlshead Mountains are primarily known for the scenic canyons found within the range that are made up of Decomposed granite.  Some of the most well known canyons include Wingate Slot Canyon, Slickenside Canyon, Talc Canyon, Owlshead Canyon, Contact Canyon, Granite Canyon, Through Canyon, Smoke Tree Canyon, Passage Canyon, Sand Canyon, and Sagenite Canyon.  Visitation to these canyons is somewhat limited due to the remote location of the Owlshead Mountains and the long distances required to reach the canyons by hiking.  Within the range there are three usually dry playa lake beds – Owl Lake, Lost Lake, and Wingate Lake.

See also
Mountain ranges of the Mojave Desert
Epsom Salts Monorail

References

External links
 TopoZone: Owlshead Mountains interactive map and more (USGS)

Death Valley
Mountain ranges of the Mojave Desert
Mountain ranges of San Bernardino County, California
Mountain ranges of Southern California
Death Valley National Park